The women's doubles tournament of the 2021 BWF World Championships took place from 12 to 19 December 2021 at the Palacio de los Deportes Carolina Marín at Huelva.

Seeds

The seeding list is based on the World Rankings of 23 November 2021.

 Chen Qingchen / Jia Yifan (champions)
 Lee So-hee / Shin Seung-chan (final)
 Kim So-yeong / Kong Hee-yong (semi-finals)
 Mayu Matsumoto / Wakana Nagahara (semi-finals)
 Greysia Polii / Apriyani Rahayu (withdrew)
 Jongkolphan Kititharakul / Rawinda Prajongjai (quarter-finals)
 Nami Matsuyama / Chiharu Shida (quarter-finals)
 Gabriela Stoeva / Stefani Stoeva (quarter-finals)

<li> Chloe Birch / Lauren Smith (third round)
<li> Li Wenmei / Zheng Yu (third round)
<li> Maiken Fruergaard / Sara Thygesen (third round)
<li> Puttita Supajirakul / Sapsiree Taerattanachai (third round)
<li> Pearly Tan / Thinaah Muralitharan (second round)
<li> Liu Xuanxuan / Xia Yuting (second round)
<li> Rachel Honderich / Kristen Tsai (third round)
<li> Amalie Magelund / Freja Ravn (second round)

Draw

Finals

Top half

Section 1

Section 2

Bottom half

Section 3

Section 4

References

2021 BWF World Championships